Kakumanu is a village in Guntur district of the Indian state of Andhra Pradesh. It is the headquarters of Kakumanu mandal in Tenali revenue division.

Geography 

Governance 
Kakumanu gram panchayat is the local self-government of the village. It is divided into wards and each ward is represented by a ward member.

Education 

As per the school information report for the academic year 2018–19, the village has 5 schools. These include one private and 4 Zilla/Mandal Parishad schools.

Demographics 
As per the 2011 Indian census, the population of the village is 5,777 of which 2860 are males while 2917 are females. In 2011, literacy rate of Kakumanu village was 68.83 % compared to 67.02 % of Andhra Pradesh. In Kakumanu Male literacy stands at 76.85 % while female literacy rate was 60.88 %.

See also 
List of villages in Guntur district

References 

Villages in Guntur district
Mandal headquarters in Guntur district